Maxie is an unincorporated community in Buchanan County, in the U.S. state of Virginia.

The Maxie post office was established in 1914.

References

Unincorporated communities in Virginia
Unincorporated communities in Buchanan County, Virginia